Mendinho, also Meendinho, Mendiño and Meendiño, was a medieval Iberian poet.

Nothing is known about Mendinho except by inference. Scholars generally assume from the reference to the shrine of San Simión (in the modern Isle of  San Simón, Rías Baixas of Vigo, Spain) that he was Galician. And it is supposed from his name (without any accompanying patronym or toponym), his style, and the place of his song in the manuscripts (the Cancioneiro da Vaticana, Vatican Library, and the Cancioneiro da Biblioteca Nacional, Lisbon, Portugal) that he was a jogral - a non-noble Minstrel.

Mendinho may have been active in the early 13th century, making him one of the earliest poets in this genre whose work has survived. A single cantiga de amigo (song about a boyfriend sung in the feminine) is attributed to him - Sedia-m' eu na ermida de San Simion, but it is among the most famous in the Galician-Portuguese lyric corpus of around 1685 texts. It has been admired for its imagery (critics say the girl is afraid of the waves of her own passion), its rhythm, and its formal and semantic parallelism (including the system of alternating strophes with the rhymes-sounds -on(or)/-ar). The text in the manuscripts is problematic in places, especially in the refrain, where the reading is much disputed.

In 1998, the Día das Letras Galegas (Galician Letters Day) was dedicated to Mendinho, along with Martín Codax and Xohán de Cangas. His single known poem was set to music by Alain Oulman, the French composer and long term musical collaborator of the great Portuguese Fado singer Amália Rodrigues. An English translation/adaptation of Sedia-m'eu na ermida... is contained in the longpoem The Tale of Tekarionyoken (2013) by Thomas M. Capuano (p. 33).

Sediam'eu na ermida de San Simión
Text of Cohen 2003, slightly modified.

Notes

Cohen, Rip. 500 Cantigas d’ Amigo: Edição Crítica (Porto: Campo das Letras, 2003).
Ferreira, M. do Rosário. Águas Doces, Águas Salgadas: da funcionalidade dos motivos aquáticos nas cantigas de amigo (Oporto: Granito, 1999), pp. 41–53.
Montero, Xesús Alonso. “Fortuna literaria de Meendiño”, in Estudos Portugueses. Homenagem a Luciana Stegagno Picchio (Lisbon: Difel, 1991), pp. 86–109
Oliveira, António Resende de. Depois do Espectáculo Trovadoresco. a estrutura dos cancioneiros peninsulares e as recolhas dos séculos XIII e XIV (Lisbon: Edições Colibri, 1994), pp. 391–92.
Reckert, Stephen & Helder Macedo. Do cancioneiro de Amigo (Lisbon: Assírio e Alvim, 1996), pp. 145–51.
Tavani, Giuseppe. "Meendinho", in G. Lanciani & G. Tavani, edd., Dicionário da Literatura Medieval Galega e Portuguesa (Lisbon: Caminho, 1993), p. 456.
Tavani, Giuseppe. Trovadores e Jograis: Introdução à poesia medieval galego-portuguesa (Lisbon: Caminho, 2002), pp. 417–18.

Galician poets
Galician-Portuguese
Portuguese language
Galician language
Galician culture
Year of birth unknown
Year of death unknown
Spanish male poets